"Julbocken", with the opening lines "En jul när mor var liten", is a Christmas song written by Alice Tegnér. The lyrics describe a time when the Julbocken (Yule goat  or Christmas goat) was still a more popular Christmas gift-bringer in Sweden than the Jultomten (Christmas elves or gnomes) or Santa Claus. The lyrics describe the goat giving presents, a doll for "Mother" when she was a child, who was frightened when the goat jumped; and for her brother, a drum and a trumpet. When the goat is old, he returns to "Mother", who now has children of her own.

Publications
Sjung med oss, Mamma! 6, 1913

Recordings
A recording was done by Alice Babs in Stockholm in November 1963. Another recording was done by pupils from Stockholms musikgymnasium and Stockholms musikklasser on the 1972 album God morgon, mitt herrskap. The song was also recorded by Anita Lindblom on her 1975 Christmas album Jul med tradition.

References 
Footnotes

Sources

1913 songs
Swedish Christmas songs
Swedish-language songs
Anita Lindblom songs